Robert G. Cato (September 5, 1923 – March 19, 1999) was an American photographer and graphic designer whose work in record album cover design contributed to the development of music and popular culture for five decades. He was vice president of creative services at Columbia Records, and later at United Artists.

Biography
Bob Cato was born in 1923 to Cuban immigrant Ysabel Soto and Robert Bailey Cato in New Orleans, Louisiana. As a teenager, he studied with Mexican painters Pablo O'Higgins and José Clemente Orozco. A Quaker, Cato was imprisoned during World War II as a conscientious objector. He then lived in Chicago, studying with László Moholy-Nagy of the Bauhaus school. Moving to Philadelphia in 1947, Cato studied with renowned art director and magazine designer Alexey Brodovitch, eventually becoming Brodovitch's  assistant at Harper's Bazaar.

Cato painted and exhibited throughout the 1940s and 1950s, while serving as art director at Dance, Glamour, Jr. Bazaar and Theatre Arts magazines. 

Cato began working in the music industry in 1959 at Columbia Records, becoming vice president of creative services there and later at United Artists. During the next 20 years, he designed and oversaw hundreds of albums for dozens of artists, forging lasting relationships with many, including The Band, Johnny Cash, Miles Davis, Bob Dylan, George Harrison, Janis Joplin, and Van Morrison.

In 1966, he directed the CBS-TV miniseries Playback, featuring Leonard Bernstein, Miles Davis, John Gielgud, Johnny Mathis, and Igor Stravinsky. He also served for many years on the National Academy of Recording Arts and Sciences advisory council. In 1997, the Academy awarded Cato the President's Merit Award.

Among Cato's other accomplishments was a redesign of McCalls, art directorships of Ladies' Home Journal and Jazz Review, and while vice president of Revlon, he conceived and designed the Charlie fragrance campaign, contracting Lauren Hutton to be the brand ambassador. He produced the book Joyce Images (1994), a collection of photos and art devoted to James Joyce. Cato also taught, at the School of Visual Arts and the Rochester Institute of Technology.

Bob Cato was married to Kate Jennings, an Australian writer, poet and novelist, in 1988.  He died as a result of complications of Alzheimer's disease in 1999 in New York City.

His archive is at the Rochester Institute of Technology.

Awards

 1964, Grammy Awards for Best Album Cover of the Year for Barbra Streisand's People 

1968, Grammy Awards for Best Album Cover of the Year for Bob Dylan - Greatest Hits
1997, President's Merit Award, National Academy of Recording Arts and Sciences

References

External links 
Bob Cato Discography

1923 births
1999 deaths
Album-cover and concert-poster artists
Artists from New Orleans
Artists from Chicago
Artists from Philadelphia
American conscientious objectors
American graphic designers
Deaths from Alzheimer's disease
20th-century American photographers
Columbia Records
United Artists Records
Deaths from dementia in New York (state)